Emohua is a local government area in Rivers State, Nigeria. Its headquarters are in the town of Emohua.

Emohua consists of fourteen political wards. Emohua LGA has fertile land that favours primary production such as farming. The presence of water bodies gives room for activities of primary production such as sand dredging and fishing. Furthermore, the presence, popularity and proximity of its markets favour secondary production such as oil milling, cassava processing rice processing, yam processing, meat processing (abattoir) and wood milling and poultry.Landmarks Rivers State university Emohua Campus (Socal Sciences)

The postal code of the area is 511.

References

Local Government Areas in Rivers State
1991 establishments in Nigeria
1990s establishments in Rivers State